Untermyer or Untermaier may refer to:

Untermyer Fountain, in Manhattan, New York
Untermyer Park and Gardens, in Yonkers, New York

People with the surname
Cécile Untermaier (born 1951), French politician and civil servant
Irwin Untermyer (1886-1973), American jurist, civic leader, and patron of the arts
Samuel Untermyer (1858–1940), American Zionist, lawyer, civic leader and millionaire
Samuel Untermyer II (1912–2001), United States nuclear scientist

See also
Untermeyer (disambiguation)